The GameCube Game Boy Advance cable (DOL-011) is a cable used to connect the Game Boy Advance (GBA) to the GameCube (GCN). Depending on the games, the cable may facilitate unlocking additional content, turning the GBA into a second screen, turning the GBA into a separate controller, or transferring in-game items between related games.

Development
The concept of a cable that allowed for the transfer of data and second-screen gameplay was originally conceived for the Nintendo 64 as the "GB Connection Cable", which would allow certain Nintendo 64DD games to connect to compatible Game Boy Color cartridges. However, the device was never released—interactivity between Nintendo 64 and Game Boy games was limited to those that supported the Transfer Pak, released in 1998.

Compatibility

Systems
The cable has one end that plugs into a GameCube controller slot and another end that plugs into the GBA's extension port. The cable is compatible with the GameCube and the Wii on the console side; and the Game Boy Advance, Game Boy Advance SP, Game Boy Player, and e-Reader on the portable side. When used with the Game Boy Player accessory, the Game Boy Advance system can be used to control any Game Boy game played through the GameCube.

Because the Game Boy Micro has a differently-shaped link port, the official cable does not work with it, but enthusiasts have been able to hack together homemade versions which do. It is also incompatible with the Nintendo DS family, as the original Nintendo DS and DS Lite's backwards compatibility for the Game Boy Advance does not extend to its accessories, lacking the necessary extension port.

Games
The following is a list of compatible GameCube games, with the corresponding Game Boy Advance (GBA) game or N/A if no GBA game is required.

See also 
 Transfer Pak
 Game Boy Player

References

External links
The Ultimate List: Cube Connection (IGN)

GameCube accessories
Game Boy accessories